This is a list of candidates of the 1978 New South Wales state election. The election was held on 7 October 1978.

Retiring Members
Note: Tom Lewis MLA (Liberal, Wollondilly), George Neilly MLA (Labor, Cessnock) and Bruce Webster MLA (Liberal, Pittwater) all resigned some months prior to the election, but avoiding by-elections for their seats was one of the pretexts for the early election.

Labor
 William Coulter MLC
 Walter Geraghty MLC
 Edna Roper MLC
 Amelia Rygate MLC
 Leroy Serisier MLC
 Norman Thom MLC

Liberal
 Douglas Darby MLA (Manly)
 Keith Doyle MLA (Vaucluse)
 Ian Griffith MLA (Cronulla)
 Gordon Mackie MLA (Albury)
 Thomas Erskine MLC
 Stanley Eskell MLC
 Dick Evans MLC
 Ted Humphries MLC
 Thomas McKay MLC
 Anne Press MLC
 Bob Scott MLC
 Sir Edward Warren MLC

Country
 Sir Harry Budd MLC
 Otway Falkiner MLC
 Sir John Fuller MLC
 Sir Asher Joel MLC
 Geoffrey Keighley MLC
 Richmond Manyweathers MLC
 Ronald Raines MLC

Legislative Assembly
Sitting members are shown in bold text. Successful candidates are highlighted in the relevant colour. Where there is possible confusion, an asterisk (*) is also used.

Legislative Council
Sitting members are shown in bold text. Tickets that elected at least one MLC are highlighted in the relevant colour. Successful candidates are identified by an asterisk (*).

See also
 Members of the New South Wales Legislative Assembly, 1978–1981
 Members of the New South Wales Legislative Council, 1978–1981

References
 
 Parliament of New South Wales. Parliamentary Papers (1981–82).

1978